Burj Aziz Khan Dam is located near Quetta in Balochistan, Pakistan. It was constructed at a cost of $291 million  to supply water to Quetta.

See also
 List of dams and reservoirs in Pakistan

Notes

Dams in Balochistan, Pakistan